Lindegren is a Swedish surname. Notable people with the surname include:

 Arthur Lindegren (1911–1981), American swimmer
 Erik Lindegren (1910–1968), Swedish author, poet, and member of the Swedish Academy
 Yrjö Lindegren (1900–1952), Finnish architect

See also
 Lindgren, surname

Swedish-language surnames